The Laugavegur Ultramarathon is an annual ultramarathon race held on the Laugavegur in Iceland. Running from Landmannalaugar past the Hrafntinnusker mountain and Álftavatn lake, across the Bláfjallakvísl river, through the Emstrur plain and across the Fremri-Emstruá river to Þórsmörk, it covers a total of 55 km.

The race has been held annually since 1997; the 2011 race is scheduled for July 16, 2011.

Past races

2010 

The 2010 race was held on July 17, 2010. A total of 279 runners started the race; 267 runners finished, among them 189 men and 78 women. The oldest participant was Jørgen Nautrup of Denmark, who was born in 1942 and finished the race in 7:28:41; the youngest participants were Jón Hinrik Höskuldsson and Guðrún Ólafsdóttir of Iceland, who were born in 1991 and finished the race in 8:46:02 and 7:02:57, respectively.

Top ten men

Top ten women

2009 

The 2009 race was held on July 18, 2009. A total of 321 runners started the race; 313 runners finished, among them 238 men and 75 women. The oldest participants were Gunnar J. Geirsson and Baldur Jónsson of Iceland, who were born in 1944 and finished the race in 7:13:38 and 8:05:33, respectively; the youngest participant was Karl Rúnar Martinsson of Iceland, who was born in 1991 finished the race in 6:35:21.

Top ten men

Top ten women

2008 

The 2008 race was held on July 12, 2008. Nearly 250 runners started the race; 215 runners finished, among them 162 men and 53 women. The oldest participant was Pétur H Blöndal of Iceland, who was born in 1944 and finished the race in 8:10:44 hours; the youngest participant was Elvar Þór Karlsson of Iceland, who was born in 1990 and finished the race in 6:56:27.

Top ten men

Top ten women

1997-2010 all-time best results

All-time top ten men

All-time top ten women

References

External links 
 Official website
 Laugavegur Ultramarathon on Facebook

Ultramarathons
Athletics competitions in Iceland
Recurring sporting events established in 1997
1997 establishments in Iceland